Roving Enterprises Pty Ltd is an Australian television production company, owned by television presenter, producer and comedian Rove McManus and his business partner Craig Campbell and managed by General Manager Kevin Whyte.  The company is responsible for producing many shows and events, particularly for Network Ten.

Productions

 Programs with a shaded background indicate the program is still in production.

Fire
In October 2004, one of Roving Enterprises production offices in Abbotsford, a Melbourne suburb, was destroyed by a large fire that caused up to $2 million damage and required 16 fire engines and over 50 firefighters to extinguish it. The offices were used for production, graphics editing and wardrobe/props and among the many things lost, the fire destroyed pieces that were to be used for the ARIA Music Awards of 2004 ceremony. The company also lost its costume department, valuable editing equipment, computers and irreplaceable video tapes and digital footage.

References

External links
 Roving Enterprises official website
 The Project official website

state=expanded